The 2016–17 Shakhtar Donetsk season is the club's 26th season.

Season events
On 14 May 2016, Shakhtar announced the signing of Yevhen Seleznyov form Kuban Krasnodar to a two-year contract.

On 17 January, Shakhtar announced the signing of Gustavo Blanco Leschuk from Karpaty Lviv on a contract until the summer of 2020.

Squad

Transfers

In

Out

Loans out

Released

Friendlies

Competitions

Overall

Super Cup

Premier League

League table

Championship round table

Results summary

Results by round

Results

Ukrainian Cup

UEFA Champions League

Qualifying round

UEFA Europa League

Play-off round

Group stage

Knockout phase

Squad statistics

Appearances and goals

|-
|colspan="16"|Players away on loan:

|-
|colspan="16"|Players who left Shakhtar Donetsk during the season:

|}

Goalscorers

Clean sheets

Disciplinary record

Notes

References

External links 
Official website

Shakhtar Donetsk
FC Shakhtar Donetsk seasons
Ukrainian football championship-winning seasons
Shakhtar Donetsk
Shakhtar Donetsk